Arthur J. Blake (born August 19, 1966) is an American hurdler. He competed in the 110 metres hurdles at the 1988 Summer Olympics and the 1992 Summer Olympics.

References

External links
 

1966 births
Living people
Athletes (track and field) at the 1988 Summer Olympics
Athletes (track and field) at the 1992 Summer Olympics
American male hurdlers
Olympic track and field athletes of the United States
Sportspeople from Bartow, Florida
Goodwill Games medalists in athletics
Competitors at the 1990 Goodwill Games
Universiade medalists in athletics (track and field)
Universiade silver medalists for the United States
Florida State Seminoles men's track and field athletes